Sergei Fokin (born May 2, 1963 in Moscow, Soviet Union) is a former professional Russian ice hockey player.

He started his career in the Soviet Union in 1983, playing for Crystal Saratov. In 1984 he signed with Spartak Moskva and he stayed with them until 1992, when he moved to Sweden and sign with VIK Västerås HK, where he joined fellow countryman Mishat Fahrutdinov. After two season with Västerås, he signed for another Swedish team, Färjestads BK, a team that he wouldn't leave until 2002. During his time with Färjestad he won three Swedish Championships, 1997, 1998 and 2002. When he left Färjestad, he called it his retirement and he signed with a lower league team Borås HC. But during his first season with Borås was he was loaned to Malmö Redhawks for a couple of games. But these were his last games at the top level. He played two more seasons with Borås HC and in 2005 retired from ice hockey.

He represented Russia in four Hockey World Championships.

Career statistics

International statistics

External links

1963 births
Borås HC players
Färjestad BK players
HC Spartak Moscow players
Living people
Malmö Redhawks players
Russian ice hockey defencemen
Soviet ice hockey defencemen
VIK Västerås HK players